The 2004 U.S. House of Representatives election for the state of North Dakota's at-large congressional district was held November 2, 2004. The incumbent, Democratic-NPL Congressman Earl Pomeroy was re-elected to his seventh term, defeating Republican candidate Duane Sand.

Only Pomeroy filed as a Dem-NPLer, and the endorsed Republican candidate was Duane Sand, who had previously faced Democrat Kent Conrad in 2000 for North Dakota's Senate seat (see election). Pomeroy and Sand won the primary elections for their respective parties.

Although Sand ran an aggressive campaign, it was not as aggressive as that of Rick Clayburgh who had faced the congressman in the previous election. On June 26, U.S. House Majority Leader Tom DeLay visited Fargo, North Dakota to campaign for Sand.

Election results

References

See also

North Dakota
2004
2004 North Dakota elections